Numerous codes of football are played in Queensland, Australia:

The most popular football code in Queensland is rugby league

For Association Football (soccer) see Football Queensland

For rugby league see Queensland Rugby League and National Rugby League
For teams see Brisbane Broncos, Gold Coast Titans and North Queensland Cowboys
For rugby union see Queensland Rugby Union
For Australian rules see Australian rules football in Queensland